Quercus conzattii is an oak endemic to Mexico. It is placed in Quercus section Lobatae.

Description
Quercus conzattii has a varied growth habit, growing as shrub from 1 to 4 meters high, or a small to medium-sized tree 3 from 10 meters high, and rarely to 17 meters. It is often misidentified as Q. radiata or Q. urbani.

Range and habitat
Quercus conzattii has a disjunct distribution across the mountains of southern and central Mexico. It is common in the Sierra Madre de Oaxaca and eastern Sierra Madre del Sur of Oaxaca state. It is also found on the eastern slope of the southern Sierra Madre Occidental of northern Jalisco, eastern Nayarit, southern Durango, and extreme western Zacatecas states.

It is found in montane forest, woodland, savanna, and shrubland habitats between 1,700 and 2,400 meters elevation. At lower elevations it grows in monospecific stands on rocky slopes and outcrops of igneous rock. At higher elevations it is commonly found in dry forests and woodlands, mixed with other dryland oaks and pines, or in savanna-like open stands on hills.

Conservation and threats
Quercus conzattii has a stable population, and its conservation status is assessed Least Concern.

References

conzattii
Endemic oaks of Mexico
Flora of the Sierra Madre Occidental
Flora of the Sierra Madre del Sur
Flora of the Sierra Madre de Oaxaca
Least concern flora of North America
Trees of Durango
Trees of Jalisco
Trees of Nayarit
Trees of Oaxaca
Trees of Zacatecas
Taxonomy articles created by Polbot
Taxa named by William Trelease